Erich Habitzl (9 October 1923 – 26 September 2007) was an Austrian footballer. He played for Austria at the 1948 Summer Olympics. After his international play, he played as a forward for Admira Wien, able to switch between center forward and inside right. Habitzl, Karl Huber, and Josef Eisener together formed a noted forward line for Admira.

References

External links
 
 

1923 births
2007 deaths
Austrian footballers
Austria international footballers
Austrian expatriate footballers
FC Admira Wacker Mödling players
RC Lens players
FC Nantes players
Ligue 1 players
Ligue 2 players
Expatriate footballers in France
Austrian expatriate sportspeople in France
Olympic footballers of Austria
Footballers at the 1948 Summer Olympics
Association football forwards